Mithila lichenosa is the only species in the monotypic moth genus Mithila of the family Erebidae. It is endemic to the border area of southern and northern Nepal, and is found in the Janakpur Zone. Both the genus and species were first described by Frederic Moore in 1882.

References

Calpinae
Endemic fauna of Nepal
Moths of Asia
Monotypic moth genera